Goran Ivanišević was the defending champion, but did not compete that year.Yevgeny Kafelnikov won in the final 7–6(7–2), 6–4 against Petr Korda.

Seeds

Draw

Finals

Top half

Bottom half

External links
 Draw

Kremlin Cup
Kremlin Cup